Testifenon, also known as testiphenon, testiphenone, chlorphenacyl dihydrotestosterone ester, or dihydrotestosterone 17β-(4-(bis(2-chloroethyl)amino)phenyl)acetate, is a synthetic anabolic–androgenic steroid (AAS) and a cytostatic antineoplastic agent (i.e., chemotherapeutic) that was never marketed. It is an androgen ester – specifically, a chlorphenacyl nitrogen mustard ester of dihydrotestosterone (DHT) – and acts as a prodrug of these two components in the body. The drug was developed in Russia as a tissue-selective cytostatic drug for the treatment of various cancers occurring in androgen receptor-expressing tissues that would have reduced side effects and toxicity relative to other chemotherapy drugs.

See also
 List of hormonal cytostatic antineoplastic agents
 List of androgen esters § Dihydrotestosterone esters

References

Abandoned drugs
Androgens and anabolic steroids
Androstanes
Antineoplastic drugs
Dihydrotestosterone esters
Nitrogen mustards
Organochlorides
Prodrugs
Russian drugs